The Leinster Junior B Club Hurling Championship is an annual hurling competition organised by Killeedy GAA Club in Limerick since 2006 for the champion junior B hurling teams in the province of Leinster in Ireland. The Antrim and Galway champions are also represented in the competition.

The series of games are played during the winter months with the Leinster final currently being played in January. The prize for the winning team is the Alfie Hickey Memorial Cup. The championship has always been played on a straight knockout basis whereby once a team loses they are eliminated from the championship.

The Leinster Championship is an integral part of the wider All-Ireland Junior B Club Hurling Championship. The winners and runners-up of the Leinster final join the winners and runners-up of the Munster final in the semi-final stages of the All-Ireland Championship.

Sarsfields are the title-holders after defeating St. Martin's by 1–14 to 1–05 in the 2022 Leinster final.

History

Provincial club championships for respective junior B champions was the idea of the Killeedy GAA Club who, after winning the Limerick JBHC title in 2005, realised there were no provincial competitions in that grade of hurling. A senior championship had been running in Leinster since 1970, while intermediate and junior competitions had been recently introduced by GAA President Seán Kelly. Members of the Killeedy club approached a supportive Kelly, however, their proposal was rejected by Central Council. In spite of this setback, Killeedy organised their own unofficial Munster Championship for Junior B championship winners in 2005. A corresponding Leinster Championship was first organised in 2006 and received the official support of the Leinster Council.

The championship

Overview

The Leinster Championship is a single elimination tournament. Each team is afforded only one defeat before being eliminated from the championship. Pairings for matches are drawn at random and there is no seeding.

Each match is played as a single leg. If a match is drawn there is a period of extra time, however, if both sides are still level there are penalties. Only the final, if both teams are still level after a period of extra time, goes to a replay.

Competition format

Quarter-finals: Eight teams contest this round. The four winning teams advance directly to the semi-final stage. The four losing teams are eliminated from the championship.

Semi-finals: Four teams contest this round. The two winning teams advance directly to the final. The two losing teams are eliminated from the championship.

Final: The final is contested by the two semi-final winners.

Trophy

At the end of the Leinster final, the winning team is presented with a trophy. The cup, named the Alfie Hickey Memorial Cup in honour of a former St. Lachtain's hurler and Kilkenny captain, is held by the winning team until the following year's final. The winning captain accepts the cup on behalf of his team before giving a short speech. Individual members of the winning team then have an opportunity to lift the cup.

Roll of honour

List of finals

Notes:
 2019 - The first match ended in a draw.

References

Junior B